Harold Daniels was an actor and then a director of American films. He directed about 14 films.

The 1958 Terror in the Haunted House he directed was the first to use the technique known as Psychorama.

Daniels was born Harold Goldstein in Pittsburgh. His brother, Sam, was a makeup artist for RKO Pictures.

Filmography

Director
They Met in Argentina (1941), assistant director
The Greatest Gift (1942), short film
The Woman from Tangier (1948)
The Lawton Story (1948), co-director
Daughter of the West (1949)
Roadblock (1951)
Sword of Venus (1953)
Port Sinister (1953)
Bayou (1957)
Terror in the Haunted House (1958)
Date with Death (1959)
The Phantom (1961)
Ten Girls Ago (1962)
House of the Black Death (1965), one of the directors
Diabolic Wedding (1971), one of the directors

Actor
Trail Dust (1936)
Hollywood Cowboy (1937)
Doomed at Sundown (1937)
Oklahoma Renegades (1940)
 Secrets of a Model (1940)

References

American film directors

Year of birth missing
Possibly living people